Z. laeta may refer to:

 Zuniga laeta, a jumping spider
 Zygaena laeta, a European moth